Moose Jaw City was a provincial electoral district in the Canadian province of Saskatchewan. This constituency existed from 1905 to 1967 when it was divided into Moose Jaw North and Moose Jaw South (Wakamow). It was the riding of Opposition leader Wellington Willoughby.

From 1921 to 1967 Moose Jaw City was one of three districts in the province that elected more than one representative to the Legislature.

Election results
For years with multiple winners, names of successful candidates are in bold.

|-

| style="width: 130px"|Provincial Rights
|John Henry Wellington
|align="right"|464
|align="right"|53.15%
|align="right"|–

|- bgcolor="white"
!align="left" colspan=3|Total
!align="right"|873
!align="right"|100.00%
!align="right"|

|-

| style="width: 130px"|Provincial Rights
|John Henry Wellington
|align="right"|763
|align="right"|50.49%
|align="right"|-2.66

|Independent
|Oswald Baynes Fysh
|align="right"|66
|align="right"|4.37%
|align="right"|–
|- bgcolor="white"
!align="left" colspan=3|Total
!align="right"|1,511
!align="right"|100.00%
!align="right"|

|-

| style="width: 130px"|Conservative
|Wellington Willoughby
|align="right"|951
|align="right"|52.83%
|align="right"|+2.34

|Independent
|Harry Peters
|align="right"|58
|align="right"|3.22%
|align="right"|-1.15
|- bgcolor="white"
!align="left" colspan=3|Total
!align="right"|1,800
!align="right"|100.00%
!align="right"|

|-

| style="width: 130px"|Conservative
|Wellington Willoughby
|align="right"|1,621
|align="right"|41.07%
|align="right"|-11.76

|Labour
|William George Baker
|align="right"|998
|align="right"|25.28%
|align="right"|–
|- bgcolor="white"
!align="left" colspan=3|Total
!align="right"|3,947
!align="right"|100.00%
!align="right"|

|-

|Labour
|William George Baker
|align="right"|1,531
|align="right"|43.88%
|align="right"|+18.60
|- bgcolor="white"
!align="left" colspan=3|Total
!align="right"|3,489
!align="right"|100.00%
!align="right"|

|-

| style="width: 130px"|Labour
|William George Baker
|align="right"|3,132
|align="right"|26.43%

|Independent
|Hugh McKellar
|align="right"|733
|align="right"|6.18%
|- bgcolor="white"
!align="left" colspan=3|Total
!align="right"|11,851
!align="right"|100.00%

|-

|Conservative
|Robert Henry Smith
|align="right"|2,307
|align="right"|37.04%
|align="right"|-
|- bgcolor="white"
!align="left" colspan=3|Total
!align="right"|6,229
!align="right"|100.00%
!align="right"|

| style="width: 130px"|Conservative
|John Alexander Merkley
|align="right"|4,372
|align="right"|26.12%

| style="width: 130px"|Conservative
|Robert Henry Smith
|align="right"|4,209
|align="right"|25.14%

|- bgcolor="white"
!align="left" colspan=3|Total
!align="right"|16,742
!align="right"|100.00%

|-

| style="width: 130px"|Conservative
|John Alexander Merkley
|align="right"|Acclaimed
|align="right"|100.00%
|- bgcolor="white"
!align="left" colspan=3|Total
!align="right"|Acclamation
!align="right"|

|-

|Conservative
|John Alexander Merkley
|align="right"|2,137
|align="right"|11.34%
|align="right"|-

|Conservative
|Arthur W. E. Fawkes
|align="right"|2,005
|align="right"|10.63%
|align="right"|-
|- bgcolor="white"
!align="left" colspan=3|Total
!align="right"|18,854
!align="right"|100.00%
!align="right"|

|-

| style="width: 130px"|CCF
|John W. Corman
|align="right"|6,296
|align="right"|30.69%
|align="right"|-

| style="width: 130px"|CCF
|D. Henry R. Heming
|align="right"|5,894
|align="right"|28.73%
|align="right"|-

|Prog. Conservative
|Russell L. Brownridge
|align="right"|1,271
|align="right"|6.20%
|align="right"|-

|Prog. Conservative
|Hugh A. Tiers
|align="right"|1,036
|align="right"|5.05%
|align="right"|-

|- bgcolor="white"
!align="left" colspan=3|Total
!align="right"|20,514
!align="right"|100.00%
!align="right"|

|-

| style="width: 130px"|CCF
|John W. Corman
|align="right"|7,534
|align="right"|30.06%
|align="right"|-

| style="width: 130px"|CCF
|D. Henry R. Heming
|align="right"|7,331
|align="right"|29.26%
|align="right"|-

|Independent
|H. Gordon Young
|align="right"|5,240
|align="right"|20.91%
|align="right"|-

|Independent
|J. Fraser McClellan
|align="right"|4,955
|align="right"|19.77%
|align="right"|-
|- bgcolor="white"
!align="left" colspan=3|Total
!align="right"|25,060
!align="right"|100.00%
!align="right"|

|-

| style="width: 130px"|CCF
|John W. Corman
|align="right"|7,555
|align="right"|33.67%
|align="right"|-

| style="width: 130px"|CCF
|D. Henry R. Heming
|align="right"|7,527
|align="right"|33.54%
|align="right"|-

|- bgcolor="white"
!align="left" colspan=3|Total
!align="right"|22,440
!align="right"|100.00%
!align="right"|

|-

| style="width: 130px"|CCF
|D. Henry R. Heming
|align="right"|6,936
|align="right"|24.99%
|align="right"|-

| style="width: 130px"|CCF
|William Davies
|align="right"|6,756
|align="right"|24.34%
|align="right"|-

|Independent
|Richard N. Lillico
|align="right"|4,522
|align="right"|16.29%
|align="right"|-

|Prog. Conservative
|C. T. McConnell
|align="right"|1,017
|align="right"|3.67%
|align="right"|-

|Independent
|W. E. Rogers
|align="right"|192
|align="right"|0.69%
|align="right"|-
|- bgcolor="white"
!align="left" colspan=3|Total
!align="right"|27,757
!align="right"|100.00%
!align="right"|

|-

| style="width: 130px"|CCF
|William Davies
|align="right"|6,794
|align="right"|22.44%
|align="right"|-

| style="width: 130px"|CCF
|Gordon Snyder
|align="right"|6,610
|align="right"|21.83%
|align="right"|-

|Prog. Conservative
|Ralph Bamford
|align="right"|3,253
|align="right"|10.74%
|align="right"|-

|Prog. Conservative
|Daniel J. Patterson
|align="right"|2,804
|align="right"|9.26%
|align="right"|-

|- bgcolor="white"
!align="left" colspan=3|Total
!align="right"|30,278
!align="right"|100.00%
!align="right"|

|-

| style="width: 130px"|CCF
|William Davies
|align="right"|7,749
|align="right"|24.55%
|align="right"|-

| style="width: 130px"|CCF
|Gordon Snyder
|align="right"|7,550
|align="right"|23.92%
|align="right"|-

|Prog. Conservative
|Daniel J. Patterson
|align="right"|7,115
|align="right"|22.54%
|align="right"|-

|Prog. Conservative
|Gordon A. Hume
|align="right"|3,697
|align="right"|11.71%
|align="right"|-
|- bgcolor="white"
!align="left" colspan=3|Total
!align="right"|31,566
!align="right"|100.00%
!align="right"|

See also
Moose Jaw – Northwest Territories territorial electoral district (1870–1905).

Electoral district (Canada)
List of Saskatchewan provincial electoral districts
List of Saskatchewan general elections
List of political parties in Saskatchewan

References
 Saskatchewan Archives Board – Saskatchewan Election Results By Electoral Division

Moose Jaw
Former provincial electoral districts of Saskatchewan
1905 establishments in Saskatchewan
1967 disestablishments in Saskatchewan